News Channel Nebraska (NCN) is an independent, in-state network of commercial radio and television stations in the U.S. state of Nebraska and Sioux City. It is operated by Flood Communications LLC, which was founded by attorney, businessman and Congressman Mike Flood. The television stations are all members of the NCN network.

History 
News Channel Nebraska was founded in 2015 at Norfolk, Nebraska. In 2017, Flood Communications announced the addition of Spanish-language network Telemundo, also called Telemundo Nebraska.

In addition to commercial advertising, NCN holds pledge drives and solicits donations in the same manner as non-commercial broadcasters.

Programming

News Channel Nebraska primarily focuses on rolling news coverage similar to the original CNN Headline News and the current NewsNet, whose owner and founder helped establish the format on the News Channel Nebraska stations. Newscasts air every hour and focus primarily on rural Nebraska stories with some coverage of the two major cities, Lincoln and Omaha, and weather forecasts every 10 minutes including former WTNH-TV meteorologist Geoff Fox broadcasting from his home studio in Irvine, California. The network also includes extensive coverage of high school and small college sports with two broadcast trucks covering rural football and basketball games. There is a "north" and "south" feed which show different sports programs, with the other feed's game rebroadcast on delay. High school sports programming requires a subscription when viewed online. In order to avoid conflicts of interest, articles and news coverage involving Flood are written by the Associated Press or Gray Television affiliates in Nebraska.

In March 2020, NCN launched Quarantine Tonight, a show featuring live music from local musicians originally produced as a service to viewers during the COVID-19 pandemic that proved popular enough to continue well past its original planned ending date. Flood was the host of Quarantine Tonight until he began his run for Congress, since then the program has been hosted by former News Channel Nebraska reporter Austen Hagood. 

NCN carries some limited syndicated lifestyle programming on weekend mornings, including AgPhD, Ron Hazelton's HouseCalls and P. Allen Smith Garden Style.

 Rolling News
 NCN Daybreak (Mon-Fri 6am-10am)
 NCN Midday (Mon-Fri 10am-4pm)
 NCN Evening (Mon-Thu 4pm-6am, Fri 4pm-Midnight)
 NCN Weekend (Sat-Sun 4pm-Midnight)
 Non-News Programming
 Quarantine Tonight
 High School Football
 Girls High School Volleyball
 High School Basketball
Nebraska Loves Public Schools
 College Football
 Women's College Volleyball

Low-powered television stations 
NCN consists of seven low-power TV stations that make up the network, all stations have callsigns beginning with a K, as licensed by the Federal Communications Commission (FCC). Combined, they reach almost all of eastern and central Nebraska, as well as parts of Siouxland. The stations are owned by Flood Communications of Nebraska, LLC.

Digital television

Digital channels 
The digital signals of NCN's stations are multiplexed:

References 

Television stations in Nebraska